Ineum Consulting was a management consulting company based in France that specialized in corporate strategy, organizational design, information system management and project management through the application of functional and industry expertise.

Ineum was formed as a spin-off from Deloitte France's consulting division in approximately 2005.

In April 2010, Ineum Consulting announced its decision to merge with Kurt Salmon Associates, a management consulting firm founded in 1935 with specialization in the retail and consumer products and health care industries. The company officially merged with Kurt Salmon Associates on January 1, 2011 to form Kurt Salmon. Kurt Salmon is a company of Management Consulting Group Plc, listed on the London Stock Exchange along with Alexander Proudfoot Consulting, specialists in performance improvement.

Kurt Salmon's European headquarters are located in Paris with North America headquarters in New York. The firm now has approximately 1,400 employees worldwide in Algeria, Australia, Belgium, China, France, Japan, Luxembourg, Morocco, Switzerland, Tunisia, United Kingdom and the United States.

External links
Official Kurt Salmon website

Management consulting firms of France